In group theory, an area of mathematics, an infinite group is a group whose underlying set contains an infinite number of elements. In other words, it is a group of infinite order.

Examples 
 (Z, +), the group of integers with addition is infinite
 Non-discrete Lie groups are infinite. For example, (R, +), the group of real numbers with addition is an infinite group
 The general linear group of order n > 0 over an infinite field is infinite

See also 
Finite group
Infinite group theory